Jimmy Sweetzer (born 8 January 1960) is an English former professional footballer who played as a striker.

Career
Born in Woking, Sweetzer played for Oxford United, Millwall and Wealdstone.

Personal life
His brothers Billy and Gordon were also professional footballers.

References

1960 births
Living people
English footballers
Oxford United F.C. players
Millwall F.C. players
Wealdstone F.C. players
English Football League players
Association football forwards
Sportspeople from Woking